Sidharth Bhardwaj (born 3 March 1987) is a VJ, model, actor and the winner of MTV Splitsvilla 2, a dating television reality show on MTV India. Siddharth won the reality show along with Sakshi Pradhan winning Rs 5,00,000. He was a contestant on the reality show Bigg Boss 5 in 2011 and became the second runner-up.

Career
Bhardwaj started his career in 2009, with participated in MTV Splitsvilla 2 where he emerged as the winner with Sakshi Pradhan. In 2011, he participated in the reality show, Bigg Boss in its fifth season and entered as a wild card entrant. Sidharth survived till the end where he emerged as the second runner up in January 2012. Juhi Parmar emerged as the winner.

In 2014, Bhardwaj made his acting debut in Ekta Kapoor's film Kuku Mathur Ki Jhand Ho Gayi marking his entry in Bollywood. It failed at the box office. 

In 2015, Bhardwaj participated in Colors TV's Fear Factor: Khatron Ke Khiladi 6.He is currently based in Los Angeles.

Television

Films

References

External links
Vodafone MTV Splitsvilla 2
MTV Splitsvilla 5
Vodafone MTV Splitsvilla 2: Hot Sakshi Pradhan Wallpaper
I’m their Diwali gift: Siddharth Bhardwaj - Hindustan Times

Living people
Kendriya Vidyalaya alumni
1987 births
Bigg Boss (Hindi TV series) contestants
Fear Factor: Khatron Ke Khiladi participants
Indian VJs (media personalities)